Flyday is the seventh album by the German jazz rock band Kraan.

Track listing
All songs composed by Helmut Hattler and Peter Wolbrandt.

Side one
 "Far West" – 2:31
 "My brother said" – 3:42
 "Ausflug" – 7:15
 "Gayu Gaya" – 5:05

Side two
 "You're right" – 5:59
 "Young king's song" – 5:36
 "Buy buy" – 3:37
 "Flyday" – 3:19

Personnel
 Peter Wolbrandt – Guitars, vocals, strings, percussions
 Hellmut Hattler – Bass, vocals, percussion
 Ingo Bischof – Moogs
 Udo Dahmen – Drums

External links

References

Kraan albums
1978 albums
Albums produced by Conny Plank
Harvest Records albums